Myiobius is a genus of passerine birds in the family Tityridae. The genus was previously considered to belong to the Tyrannidae.

The genus Myiobius was erected in 1839 by George Robert Gray in the section on birds in The Zoology of the Voyage of H.M.S. Beagle under the Command of Captain Fizroy R.N., during the years 1832-1836. The type species is the whiskered myiobius.

The genus contains four species:

References

 
Bird genera
Taxa named by George Robert Gray
Taxonomy articles created by Polbot